Jach'a Phasa (Aymara, jach'a big, phasa edible earth, Hispanicized spellings Jachapasa, Jachapaza, Jachaphasa, Jachcha Paza) is an archaeological site in Bolivia located in the La Paz Department, Pacajes Province, Calacoto Municipality, about 2 km north-east of Rosario.

The place is covered with more than 50 chullpa and surrounded by a wall. The chullpa are constructed of stone of volcanic origin and mortar of mud and straw.

Near Jach'a Phasa there are more archaeological sites, the chullpa and the walls of Taypi Phasa (at ) and the walls of Thiya Phasa (Tiaphasa) as well as Ch'iyara Chullpa situated about 3 km east of Rosario, a place with 78 chullpa.

References 

 Risto Kesseli, Martti Pärssinen, Identidad étnica y muerte: torres funerarias (chullpas) como símbolos de poder étnico en el altiplano boliviano de Pakasa (1250-1600 d. C.)], p. 396 (Spanish)
 * Michel Marcos, El Señorío prehispánico de Carangas (Publicación Digital Saberes Bolivianos 2011), p. 60 (Spanish)

Archaeological sites in Bolivia
Mountains of La Paz Department (Bolivia)
Tombs in Bolivia
Buildings and structures in La Paz Department (Bolivia)